Adaptive reasoning refers to a problem solving strategy that adapts thinking to address a problem as it changes and evolves.

Some definitions
Adaptive reasoning may also refer to the adaption of thought processes, problem solving strategies, and conceptual framework, in response and anticipation of the changing nature of the problem being considered.
 "Adaptive reasoning refers to the capacity to think logically about the relationships among concepts and situations and to justify and ultimately prove the correctness of a mathematical procedure or assertion. Adaptive reasoning also includes reasoning based on pattern, analogy or metaphor."
 "Capacity for logical thought, reflection, explanation and justification."
 "The ability of an agent to intelligently adapt its behavior, both short-term and long-term in response to the changing needs of its problem-solving situation"

References

See also

 Problem solving
 List of thought processes

Problem solving methods
Cognition
Reasoning